Jean-Luc Molinéris (born 25 August 1950 in Grenoble) was a French professional road bicycle racer. Molinéris is the son of cyclist Pierre Molinéris. In 1974, Molinéris won a stage in the 1974 Tour de France. In 1976, he won Paris–Bourges.

Major results

1971
Étoile de Bessèges
1972
Étoile de Bessèges
1974
Ambert
Concarneau
Tour de France:
Winner stage 6A
1976
GP de Peymeinade
Paris–Bourges

External links 

Official Tour de France results for Jean-Luc Molineris

French male cyclists
1950 births
Living people
French Tour de France stage winners
Sportspeople from Grenoble
Cyclists from Auvergne-Rhône-Alpes